The WF Trac is the current version of a tractor developed by Mercedes-Benz and based on their Unimog platform. It was originally known as the MB Trac. The WF Trac was developed by Mercedes-Benz between 1973 and 1991. During that time, its design featured four identical wheels, high road speeds, and powerful engines— a concept that was considered revolutionary.  

Some offshoots have been manufactured since Mercedes-Benz abandoned the agricultural business, and several companies incorporated the technology into their own products. Production and development of the product continue at Werner Forst & Industrietechnik (Werner Foresting and Industrial Technology) in Trier, Germany.

History
The Unimog was quite successful, although it was originally intended as an agricultural platform. As a result, Daimler-Benz produced a new vehicle in 1972, the MB Trac, designed to be more oriented for larger-scale mechanical farming. The new tractor combined the Unimog all-wheel-drive technology and a power transmission onto four large wheels with the appearance of a tractor— a slim hood, behind it an angular, highly rising driver cab. In contrast to conventional tractors, the cab is situated between the axles, similar to large four-wheel-drive wheel loaders. However, the driver does not steer with an articulated front and rear but with a normal steerable front axle.

From the initial MB Trac 65 and MB Trac 70 (later MB Trac 700), a broad platform evolved into the heavy-duty MB Trac 1500 within a few years. It culminated in the MB Trac 1800 Intercooler, which was the last edition. The MB Trac was successful on the market, though it did not meet the high expectations Mercedes-Benz had set. Daimler-Benz later merged the MB Trac with the agricultural machinery activities of Deutz AG. The manufacturing of the MB Trac series ended in 1991 when the production line was taken over by the Werner company. Forty-one thousand vehicles were produced of the original MB Trac. 30,000 are still in service.

In Belgium, the company UCA started converting MB Trac and WF Trac machines for rail shunting purposes in 1981.

Production series

Mercedes-Benz

First series WF trac
 WF trac 900                
 WF trac 1100               
 WF trac 1300               
 WF trac 1500               
 WF trac 1700               

Second and current series WF trac
The WF trac is now produced both in a 4x4 and a 6x6 version.
 WF trac 2040 4x4 (80 mdaN torque, 4.8 litres 4-cyl Mercedes-Benz engine)
 WF trac 2040 6x6 (80 mdaN torque, 4.8 litres 4-cyl Mercedes-Benz engine)
 WF trac 2460 4x4 (85 mdaN torque, 7.2 litres 6-cyl Mercedes-Benz engine)
 WF trac 2460 6x6 (85 mdaN torque, 7.2 litres 6-cyl Mercedes-Benz engine)

References

Further reading

External links
 , official website 
 

Tractors
Logging
German brands